The IIE MSA, formerly known as Monash South Africa, is a university located in Johannesburg, Gauteng, South Africa. The Managing Director at IIE MSA is currently Louise Wiseman.

History 
The IIE MSA was founded in 2001 as Monash South Africa by Monash University, an Australian university named after a civil engineer, John Monash.

The university was built on an agriculture land in Ruimsig, Roodeport. The first class intake at the IIE MSA was in geography and environmental sciences.

In 2019, it was renamed as IIE MSA after becoming part of The Independent Institute of Education.

Faculties

Schools

Monash South Africa no longer accepts students into degrees and diplomas the IIE MSA which bought Monash SA continued the offering which falls in the following :

Faculty of Business, Engineering and Technology 

The faculty offers a range of exciting undergraduate programmes, Honours programmes, postgraduate diplomas and master's degrees. It also recognises the busy working professional, whether they are at early, mid- or advanced career levels, and accommodates flexible part-time and postgraduate options.

The IIE MSA's Faculty of Business, Engineering and Technology offers IIE undergraduate degrees in the following areas:[7]
Accounting
Computer and Information Sciences
Economics
Electrical and Electronic Engineering
Law
Management
Marketing

It is one of only two private institutions to receive South African Institute of Chartered Accountants (SAICA) accreditation for its accounting degree. In 2013, Monash South Africa began offering the SAICA accredited Postgraduate Diploma in Accounting program, which serves as the last entrance requirement to write the South African Institute of Chartered Accountants (SAICA) board exams. This was the first time the accreditation had been offered to a private institution. Monash achieved this through a partnership with Independent service provider CA Connect. From 2018 academic year, the institution announced it would go it alone in offering the program going forward.

Faculty of Social and Health Sciences

The IIE MSA's Faculty of Social and Health Sciences currently offers IIE undergraduate degrees in the following areas:

Bachelor of Public Health
Bachelor of Social Science - with the following areas of study: 
Communication and Media Studies, 
Criminology and Criminal Justice, 
Development Studies (incorporating Human Geography), 
International Studies, 
Journalism Studies, 
Philosophy, 
Political Studies, 
Psychology, 
Public Relations Practice, and 
Sociology.
1The Bachelor of Child and Youth Care was endorsed by the South African Council of Social Service Professions.

Programmes 

A range of IIE undergraduate and postgraduate degrees and short learning programmes are offered at IIE MSA. Currently, the degrees and short programmes on offer are:

Undergraduate 
 Bachelor of Computer and Information Sciences
 Bachelor of Social Science
 Bachelor of Public Health
 Bachelor of Commerce in Law
 Bachelor of Engineering in Electrical and Electronic Engineering
 Bachelor of Engineering in Mechanical Engineering
 Bachelor of Commerce
 Bachelor of Accounting
 Bachelor of Commerce in Economics
 Bachelor of Engineering in Civil Engineering
 Bachelor of Arts

Postgraduate 
 Master of Philosophy in Arts
 Master of Philosophy in Integrated Water
 Management Master of International Business
 Master of Business Administration

References

External links
Official Site

Campuses of Monash University
Educational institutions established in 2001
Universities in Gauteng
University and college campuses in South Africa
2001 establishments in South Africa